Tapani Uitos (born 26 June 1953) is a Finnish former professional darts player who competed in the 1980s.

Darts career
A winner of the 1983 Finnish Open and 1985 BDO Nations Cup he competed in the 1985 BDO World Darts Championship but was defeated by Sweden's Stefan Lord in the first round. He returned to Lakeside in 1987 and beat Scotland's Robert MacKenzie but lost in the second round to Cliff Lazarenko. In 1988, Uitos lost in the first round to Northern Ireland's Fred McMullan.

Uitos also played in the 1986 Winmau World Masters, but lost in the first round to Chris Johns.

World Championship Results

BDO

1985: First Round (lost to Stefan Lord 1–2) (sets) 
1987: Second Round (lost to Cliff Lazarenko 0–3)
1988: First Round (lost to Fred McMullan 0–3)

External links
Profile and stats on Darts Database

Finnish darts players
Living people
1953 births
British Darts Organisation players
Sportspeople from Espoo